Mount Morgan is the highest point on Nevahbe Ridge in the Sherwin Range of the Sierra Nevada. It lies in Mono County, California, between McGee Canyon and Hilton Lakes.  The mountain is in the John Muir Wilderness Area in the Inyo National Forest.

Climate
According to the Köppen climate classification system, Mount Morgan is located in an alpine climate zone. Most weather fronts originate in the Pacific Ocean, and travel east toward the Sierra Nevada mountains. As fronts approach, they are forced upward by the peaks (orographic lift), causing them to drop their moisture in the form of rain or snowfall onto the range.

References

External links 
 

Mountains of Mono County, California
Mountains of the John Muir Wilderness
Mountains of Northern California
North American 3000 m summits
Sierra Nevada (United States)
Inyo National Forest